Taranto is a coastal city in Apulia, Southern Italy. It is the capital of the Province of Taranto, serving as an important commercial port as well as the main Italian naval base.

Founded by Spartans in the 8th century BC during the period of Greek colonisation, Taranto was among the most important in Magna Graecia, becoming a cultural, economic and military power that gave birth to philosophers, strategists, writers and athletes such as Archytas, Aristoxenus, Livius Andronicus, Heracleides, Iccus, Cleinias, Leonidas, Lysis and Sosibius. By 500 BC, the city was among the largest in the world, with a population estimated up to 300,000 people. The seven-year rule of Archytas marked the apex of its development and recognition of its hegemony over other Greek colonies of southern Italy.

During the Norman period, it became the capital of the Principality of Taranto, which covered almost all of the heel of Apulia.

Taranto is now the third-largest continental city in southern Italy (south of Rome, roughly the southern half of the Italian peninsula), with well-developed steel and iron foundries, oil refineries, chemical works, naval shipyards and food-processing factories. Taranto will host the 2026 Mediterranean Games.

Overview

Taranto's pre-history dates back to 706 BC when it was founded as a Greek colony, established by the Spartans. The ancient city was situated on a peninsula; the modern city has been built over the ancient Greek city of which only a few ruins remain, including part of the city wall, two temple columns dating to the 6th century BC, and tombs.

The Greek colonists from Sparta called the city Taras (gen.  ) after the mythical hero Taras, while the Romans, who connected the city to Rome with an extension of the Appian way, called it Tarentum.

The islets of S. Pietro and S. Paolo (St. Peter and St. Paul), collectively known as Cheradi Islands, protect the bay, called Mar Grande (Big Sea), where the commercial port is located. Taranto is known for the large population of dolphins and other cetaceans living near these islands. Another bay, called Mar Piccolo (Little Sea), is formed by the peninsula of the old city and has flourishing fishing.

At the end of the 19th century, a channel was excavated to allow naval ships to enter the Mar Piccolo harbour, and the ancient Greek city become an island connected to the mainland by bridges. The islets and the coast are strongly fortified and Mar Piccolo is a naval port with strategic importance. Because of the presence of these two bays, Taranto is also called "the city of the two seas".
The natural harbor at Taranto made it a logical home port for the Italian naval fleet before and during the First World War. During World War II, Taranto became famous for a November 1940 British air attack on the Regia Marina naval base stationed here, which today is called the Battle of Taranto.

The city's name is the origin of the common name "tarantula", originating from the terms tarantella, tarantism and tarantula — although no spider species of the family Theraphosidae inhabit the area. In ancient times, residents of Taranto bitten by the large local Wolf Spider, Lycosa tarentula, would promptly do a long vigorous dance like a jig, in order to sweat the venom out of their pores — even though the wolf spider's venom is not fatal to humans. The frenetic dance became known as the Tarantella.

In geology, Taranto gives its name to the Tarantian Age of the Pleistocene Epoch.

Physical geography

Taranto faces the Ionian Sea. It was built on a plain running north/north-west–southeast, and surrounded by the Murgia plateau from the north-west to the east. It is characterised by three natural peninsulas and a man-made island, formed by digging a ditch during the construction of Aragon Castle. The city is known as the "city of two seas" because it is washed by the Big Sea in the bay between Punta Rondinella to the northwest and Capo San Dante to the south, and by the vast reservoir of the Little Sea.

Big Sea and Little Sea

The Big Sea is frequently known as the Big Sea bay as that is where ships harbour. It is separated from the Little Sea by a cape which closes the gulf, leading to the artificial island. This island formed the heart of the original city and it is connected to the mainland by the Ponte di Porta Napoli and the Ponte Girevole. The Big Sea is separated from the Ionian Sea by the Capo San Vito, the Isole Cheradi of St Peter and St Paul, and the three islands of San Nicolicchio, which are completely incorporated by the ILVA steelworks. The latter form a little archipelago which closes off the arc creating the natural Big Sea bay.

The Little Sea is considered to be a lagoon so it presents problems of water exchange. It is virtually divided into two by the Ponte Punta Penna Pizzone, which joins the Punta Penna to the Punta Pizzone. The first of these forms a rough triangle, whose corners are the opening to the east and the Porta Napoli channel linking it to the Big Sea in the west. The second half forms an ellipse whose major axis measures almost  from the south-west to the north-east. The Galeso river flows into the first half.

The two water bodies have slightly different winds and tides and their underwater springs have different salinities. These affect the currents on the surface and in the depths of the Big Sea and the two halves of the Little Sea. In the Big Sea and in the northern part of the Little Sea, there are some underwater springs called citri, which carry undrinkable freshwater together with salt water. This creates the ideal biological conditions for cultivating Mediterranean mussels, known locally as cozze.

Climate
The climate of the city, recorded by the weather station situated near the Grottaglie Military Airport, is a hot-summer Mediterranean climate, typical of the Mediterranean with frequent continental features.

The spring is usually mild and rainy, but it is not uncommon to have sudden cold spells from the north and east, which often cause snowfall.

The summer is hot and humid, with temperatures averaging .

On 28 November 2012 a large F3 tornado hit the port of Taranto and damaged the Taranto Steel Mill; about 20 workers were injured, and another man was reported missing.

It is classified as Geographical zone C and having a degree-day of 30.

History

Taranto was founded in 706 BC by Dorian Greek immigrants hailing from Sparta. Its origin is peculiar: the founders were Partheniae ("sons of virgins"), sons of unmarried Spartan women and Perioeci (free men, but not citizens of Sparta); these out-of-wedlock unions were permitted extraordinarily by the Spartans to increase the prospective number of soldiers (only the citizens of Sparta could become soldiers) during the bloody Messenian Wars, but later they were retroactively nullified, and the sons were then obliged to leave Greece forever. Phalanthus, the Parthenian leader, went to Delphi to consult the oracle: the puzzling answer designated the harbour of Taranto as the new home of the exiles. The Partheniae arrived in Apulia, and founded the city, naming it Taras after the son of the Greek sea god, Poseidon, and of a local nymph,  According to other sources, Heracles founded the city. Another tradition indicates Taras as the founder of the city; the symbol of the Greek city (as well as of the modern city) depicts the legend of Taras being saved from a shipwreck by riding a dolphin that was sent to him by Poseidon. Taranto increased its power, becoming a commercial power and a sovereign city of Magna Graecia, ruling over the Greek colonies in southern Italy.

Its independence and power came to an end as the Romans expanded throughout Italy. Taranto won the first of two wars against Rome for the control of Southern Italy: it was helped by Pyrrhus, king of Greek Epirus, who surprised Rome with the use of war elephants in battle, a thing never seen before by the Romans. Rome won the second war in 272 BC. This subsequently cut off Taranto from the centre of Mediterranean trade, by connecting the Via Appia directly to the port of Brundisium (Brindisi).

Ancient art

Like many Greek city states, Taras issued its own coins in the 5th and 4th centuries BC.  The denomination was a Nomos, a die-cast silver coin whose weight, size and purity were controlled by the state.  The highly artistic coins presented the symbol of the city, Taras being saved by a dolphin, with the reverse side showing the likeness of a hippocamp, a horse-fish amalgam which is depicted in mythology as the beast that drew Poseidon's chariot.

Taras was also the centre of a thriving decorated Greek pottery industry during the 4th century BC.  Most of the South Italian Greek vessels known as Basilican ware were made in different workshops in the city.

Unfortunately, none of the names of the artists have survived, so modern scholars have been obliged to give the recognizable artistic hands and workshops nicknames based on the subject matter of their works, museums which possess the works, or individuals who have distinguished the works from others.  Some of the most famous of the Apulian vase painters at Taras are now called: the Iliupersis Painter, the Lycurgus Painter, the Gioia del Colle Painter, the Darius Painter, the Underworld Painter, and the White Sakkos Painter, among others.

The wares produced by these workshops were usually large elaborate vessels intended for mortuary use.  The forms produced included volute kraters, loutrophoroi, paterai, oinochoai, lekythoi, fish plates, etc.  The decoration of these vessels was red figure (with figures reserved in red clay fabric, while the background was covered in a black gloss), with overpainting (sovradipinto) in white, pink, yellow, and maroon slips.

Often the style of the drawings is florid and frilly, as was already the fashion in 4th-century Athens.  Distinctive South Italian features also begin to appear.  Many figures are shown seated on rocks.  Floral motifs become very ornate, including spiraling vines and leaves, roses, lilies, poppies, sprays of laurel, acanthus leaves.  Often the subject matter consists of naiskos scenes (scenes showing the statue of a deceased person in a naos, a miniature temple or shrine).  Most often the naiskos scene occupies one side of the vase, while a mythological scene occupies the other.  Images depicting many of the Greek myths are only known from South Italian vases, since Athenian ones seem to have had more limited repertoires of depiction.

World War II

The Battle of Taranto took place on the night of 11–12 November 1940 during the Second World War between British naval forces, under Admiral Andrew Cunningham, and Italian naval forces, under Admiral Inigo Campioni. The Royal Navy launched the first all-aircraft ship-to-ship naval attack in history, employing 21 obsolete Fairey Swordfish biplane torpedo bombers from the aircraft carrier  in the Mediterranean Sea. The attack struck the battle fleet of the Regia Marina at anchor in the harbour of Taranto, using aerial torpedoes despite the shallowness of the water.

2006 municipal bankruptcy
The Municipality of Taranto was declared bankrupt effective 31 December 2005, having accrued liabilities of €637 million. This was one of the biggest financial crises which has ever hit a municipality.

The bankruptcy declaration was made on 18 October 2006 by the receiver Tommaso Blonda. He was appointed following the resignation of the mayor, Rossana Di Bello, on account of her sixteen-month prison sentence for abuse of office and forgery of documents relating to investigations into the contract for the management of the city incinerator, awarded to Termomeccanica.

Transport

Rail
Taranto railway station connects the city with Rome, Naples, Milan, Bologna, Bari, Reggio di Calabria and Brindisi.

Air
Taranto-Grottaglie Airport is located 16 km away from Taranto, but does not offer any regularly scheduled commercial services. The two closest airports that do offer regularly scheduled commercial services are in Brindisi and Bari, approximately 70 km and 90 km away, respectively.

Other
The Ponte Girevole (swing bridge), built in 1887, runs across the navigable ship canal that joins Mar Piccolo (Little Sea) with Mar Grande (Big Sea) and stretches along . When the bridge is open, the two ends of the city are disconnected.

Environment
In 1991 Taranto was declared a high environmental risk area by the Ministry of Environment. As a consequence of the pollutants discharged into the air by the factories in the area, most notably the ILVA steel plant, part of Gruppo Riva. 7% of Taranto's pollution is produced by the public; 93% is produced by factories. In 2005, the European Pollutant Emission Register estimated dioxin emissions from the Taranto ILVA plant were responsible for 83% of Italy's total reported emissions. In 2014, the Italian National Institute of Emissions and their Sources, stated that Taranto stands third in the world behind China's Linfen, and Copşa Mică in Romania, the most polluted cities in the world due to factories' emissions.

In particular, the city produces ninety-two percent of Italy's dioxin. This is 8.8 percent of the dioxin in Europe. Between 1995 and 2004, leukaemias, myelomas and lymphomas increased by 30 to 40 percent. Dioxin accumulates over the years. Over 9 kilos of dioxin have been discharged into the city's air by its factories.  Grazing is banned within  of the ILVA plant.

In 2013, the ILVA plant was placed under special administration when its owner, the Riva family, was accused of failing to prevent toxic emissions, which caused at least 400 premature deaths. Emissions of both carbon monoxide, carbon dioxide and dioxin have decreased.  Animal species have returned that had left, including swallows, cranes, dolphins, seahorses and the coral reef.

Main sites

Taranto has a number of sites of historic value. Situated at the angle of the canal, Big Sea and Piazza Castello, the Aragon Castle was built between 1486 and 1492 by orders of King Ferdinand II of Aragon to protect the city from the Turks' frequent raids. The castle, which was designed by Italian painter and architect Francesco di Giorgio Martini, replaced a pre-existing 9th-century Byzantine fortress, which was deemed unfit for 15th-century warfare. In 1707 it ceased to be used as a military fortress and was converted to a prison until under Napoleon Bonaparte it reverted to its original military function. To date it is the property of the Italian Navy and is open to the public. Twenty-first-century excavations revealed the castle's earlier Byzantine foundations which can be viewed.

There are several Greek temple ruins - some from the 6th century BC - such as the remains of a temple dedicated to Poseidon, with its two surviving Doric columns still visible on Piazza Castello in the Città Vecchia.

The Promenade (lungomare), named after former Italian king Victor Emmanuel III, overlooks the Mar Grande, the natural harbour and commercial port.

The Concattedrale Gran Madre di Dio, designed by Gio Ponti, was built in 1967–1971 in reinforced concrete and is one of the most significant late works by the architect. In 2018 it is in poor condition and defaced by graffiti.

In the modern districts, but above all in the central Borgo Umbertino, there are also the Fountain of the Rosa dei Venti, Monumento al Marinaio, the War Memorial and the Navy Yard, another symbol of the city, some archeological sites such as the Cripta del Redentore, churches like Maria Santissima del Monte Carmelo, San Pasquale and San Francesco di Paola and 18th- and 19th-century palaces such as Palazzo Magnini, Palazzo delle Poste, Palazzo del Governo, Palazzo degli Uffici and Palazzo Savino D'Amelio.

On the outskirts and in the countryside there are several traditional ancient country houses called masseria, like Masseria Capitignano.

Old City

The Old City or Città Vecchia is where the Greeks built their acropolis. Today it retains the same street layout of 967, when the Byzantines under Nicephorus Phocas rebuilt what the Saracen troops led by the Slavic Sabir had razed to the ground in 927 AD.  There are four main arteries (Corso Vittorio II, Via Duomo, Via di Mezzo and Via Garibaldi) which run in a straight direction however the side streets were purposely built narrow and winding to impede the passage of an invading army.

Incorporating the Aragon Castle, Doric Columns, City Hall, Clock Tower and Piazza Fontana, it is situated and entirely enclosed on the artificial island between the Big and Little Seas and is reached from the New City
by crossing the Ponte Girevole (swing bridge) from the south and the Ponte di Porta Napoli from the north. Almost rectangular in shape, it is divided into four  (quarters) that are delineated by the cross formed between Via di Mezzo and  Via Nuova. These are "Baglio"  and "San Pietro" in the upper section which face the Big Sea; and  "Turipenne" and "Ponte" in the lower part fronting the Little Sea. The nobility, clergy and military personnel made their homes in Baglio and San Pietro, whilst the artisans and fishermen dwelled in Ponte and Turipenne. An Armenian community was present in the 10th and 11th centuries having arrived in Taranto as troops in the Byzantine Army. The San't Andrea degli Armeni church in Piazza Monteoliveto, located in the Baglio quarter, stands as testimony to the neighbourhood where the Armenians made their homes.

In 1746 the entire population of Taranto resided in Old City. This resulted in the necessity of building additional stories on the narrow houses. It is still inhabited with a number of people living in juxtaposition to the old palazzi. By 2013 the population of the Old City was just 1000 at a time when the wider city had more than 200,000 inhabitants.

There are a number of 17th and 18th-century palazzi in Old City. For years, they served as the main residence of local aristocratic families and the clergy. These include Palazzo Calò, Palazzo Carducci-Artenisio (1650), Palazzo Galeota (1728), Palazzo Gallo (17th century), P PMalazzo Latagliata, Palazzo Lo Jucco (1793), Palazzo D'Aquino, Palazzo Delli Ponti, Palazzo Gennarini, Palazzo d'Ayala, Palazzo Visconti, Palazzo Galizia, Palazzo Ciura and Palazzo Pantaleo. The 17th century de Beaumont-Bonelli-Bellacicco palace houses the Spartan Museum of Taranto - Hypogeum Bellacicco which extends below street and sea level to the hypogeum that is a crossroads with other hypogeum of Old City which together form the system of subterranean Taranto.

Churches include the San Cataldo Cathedral (10th century) in Piazza Duomo, San Domenico Maggiore (1302), Sant'Andrea degli Armeni (16th century), Sant'Agostino (1402), San Michele (1763), Sant'Anna, the Madonna della Salute sanctuary (1752), and San Giuseppe (16th century). Close to the San Agostino church, located near Pendio La Riccia,  the buried remains of an ancient Greek temple were discovered.

Beginning in 1934 Benito Mussolini embarked on a project of rejuvenation that involved the demolition of the working class Turipenne  along the Via Garibaldi and  ''Discesa Vasto'' which contained the homes of local fishermen as well as the old Jewish quarter. The demolitions, which also razed the old medieval wall and three churches out of the four within the area, continued until the outbreak of World War II. Modern edifices and apartment blocks were erected to replace the demolished structures.

In addition to the many palazzi,  Old City has myriad arched alleyways, saliti, vicoli and small streets, some of which are closed to traffic. Between 2013 and 2014 two Neapolitan urban artists Cyop and Kaf embarked on a project to decorate derelict buildings, walls and doors in the piazzi and vicoli with 120 representations of street art. It has since become a striking feature of Old City which is described as the abandoned district of Taranto.

Education
Among the various school are: Liceo Scientifico Battaglini, Liceo Archita (the most ancient), Liceo Quinto Ennio (in Literature), Liceo Aristosseno (Languages, Science, Humanistic), Galileo Ferraris, ITCS Pitagora da Taranto, Vittorino da Feltre, Cabrini, ITIS Righi and ITIS Pacinotti (in IT) and ITC V. Bachelet (in Commercial and Accounting – famous for the activities at BIT MILANO).

Demographics
Census populations

Dialect

The city is the centre of the Tarantino dialect (dialètte tarandíne) of the Neapolitan language. As a result of the city's history, it is influenced by Greek, Vulgar Latin, French and many others.

Sports
Taranto F.C. 1927 (Football)

2026 Mediterranean Games

Taranto will host the 2026 Mediterranean Games which will mark the fourth time Italy hosts the Mediterranean Games.

Cuisine 
Taranto's cuisine is characterised by local products, especially vegetables and fish like artichokes, eggplants, tomatoes, olives, onions, shrimps, octopus, sardines, squid and, above all, mussels. A very important role is also played by the olive oil and bread produced in the city and in all the villages of its province. Some PDO, PGI and PAT are made in the countryside of Taranto and in the villages around the city: among them we can find some extra-virgin olive oil like Terre Tarentine PDO and Terra d'Otranto PDO, fruits like Uva di Puglia PGI and Clementine del Golfo di Taranto PGI, vegetables like the Barattiere PAT, Pomodorino di Manduria PAT, types of cheese like Burrata di Andria PGI and Ricotta Forte PAT, a type of bread called Pane di Laterza PAT and the Capocollo di Martina Franca PAT, a type of capocollo.

Mussels of Taranto 

A very important ingredient of the cuisine of Taranto is mussels. They are grown in the Big Sea and, above all, in the Little Sea (see above). They have been inserted in the list of Traditional Food Products by the Italian Ministry of Agricultural, Food and Forestry Policies. The peculiar flavour of Tarantine mussels is given by the special conditions of salinity of the Little Sea which is crossed by the citri, submarine freshwater springs which manage to oxygenate the water, helping the development of the plankton and by the freshwater come from the Galeso river. The piles for the mussels were anciently made with wood from Sila Mountains in Calabria. During the Ancient Greek and Roman times, several authors described the richness and the goodness of the mussels of Taranto. After the tests about the pollution that is present in the first side of the Little Sea, the legal production of mussels has been moved to the second side. The tests and the classifications of the water are made by producers giving the possibility to certify the safety of the product. Some of the most traditional dishes of Taranto are mussels alla puppitegna (with garlic, extra-virgin olive oil and parsley) or the impepata ("full of pepper" in Italian) or spaghetti with mussels, or Tubettini with mussles.

Twin towns - sister cities
Taranto is twinned with:

 Sparta, Greece (since 2015)
 Brest, France (since 1964)
 Donetsk, Ukraine (since 1985)
 Alicante, Spain (since 2010)
 Islamabad, Pakistan (since 2010)

Notable people
These historical figures have had a relationship with the city. Not all of them were actually born in Taranto.
Archytas (428-347 BC) of Tarentum, philosopher, mathematician, astronomer, statesman, strategist and commander-in-chief of the army of Taranto
Philolaus (c. 470 - c. 385 BCE), mathematician and philosopher
Aristoxenus (c. 375 - after 335 BCE), peripatetic philosopher, and writer on music and rhythm
Leonidas of Tarentum (3rd century BCE), poet
Lysis of Tarentum (c. 5th century BCE), philosopher
Cleinias of Tarentum (4th century BCE), Pythagorean philosopher
Rhinthon (c. 323–285 BC), dramatist
Zeuxis (3rd century BCE), physician
Livius Andronicus (с. 284- с. 205 BCE), poet
Titus Quinctius Flamininus (c. 229 - c. 174 BCE), propraetor of Tarentum
Pacuvius (220 - c. 130), tragic poet, died in Tarentum in 130 BC
Cataldus (с 7th century), archbishop and patron saint of Taranto
Bohemond of Taranto (c. 1054 -1111), (born in Calabria) key military leader on the First Crusade
Philip I, Prince of Taranto, Latin Emperor in exile 1313–1332 (as Philip II), king of Albania
Gil Albornoz, archbishop of Taranto in 1644
Nicola Fago (1677-1745), composer, teacher, and church musician (maestro di cappella) in Naples
Giovanni Paisiello (1740-1816), composer associated with Naples
Carlo Balsamo di Specchia-Normandia (1890 - 1960), commander of the naval forces of Italian East Africa during the early stages of World War II.
Pierre Choderlos de Laclos, Napoleonic army general and novelist, died in Taranto
Etienne-Jacques-Joseph-Alexandre MacDonald (1765–1840), duke of Taranto and marshal of France
Marcus Fulvius Nobilior, rumoured to have been born here and not Rome as was first assumed
Riccardo Tisci, fashion designer, creative director of Givenchy
Roberta Vinci, professional tennis player
Cosimo Damiano Lanza, pianist, harpsichordist and composer
Pino De Vittorio, singer, actor
Filippo Di Stani, Italian footballer
Quentin Tarantino, whose family derives its surname from its origins in the city
Michele Riondino, actor, director, singer
Laura Albanese, Italian-Canadian newscaster and politician
Nicola Martinucci, opera singer
Alessandro Leogrande, journalist
Anna Fougez, actress and singer

See also
Tarantella
Battle of Taranto

Notes

References

External links 

Tourism in Taranto 
MARTA: Museo nazionale ARcheologico TAranto (Taranto Archaeological National Museum)

 
Coastal towns in Apulia
Cities and towns in Apulia
Localities of Salento
Mediterranean port cities and towns in Italy
Italian Navy submarine bases
Ancient cities in Sicily
Archaeological sites in Italy
Dorian colonies in Magna Graecia
Iron Age Greek colonies
Spartan colonies
700s BC
8th-century BC establishments in Italy
Magna Graecia
Steel industry of Italy